Halfway: Between Ape and Angel is an album released in 2005 by New Zealand electronica duo, Pitch Black.

Track listing
Ape To Angel (Bluetech)
Random Smiler (OG)
Freefall (Fiord)
Big Trouble (Max and Bluey)
Freefall (Friend Electric)
Flex (Peak Shift)
Elements Turn (Switch and PZ)
Freefall (ITHZ)
Elements Turn (Agent Alvin)
Empty Spaces (Module)
Freefall (Allucidination)
Empty Spaces (Avotor)
Lost In Translation (Timmy Schumacher's Latvian Dancehall Odyssey)

Pitch Black (band) albums
2005 albums